Carlo Antonio Stendardi (August 1721 - 6 July 1764) was an Italian traveler to the Ottoman empire and North African state of Algeria.

Biography
He was born in Siena to a prominent Florentine family; his father however died when he was merely months of age. Seeking advancement and profit, he spent the next three years in a trip to Smyrna (present-day Izmir in Turkey). Returning to Florence, he continued studies. In 1748, the new Grand Ducal government of Tuscany, sent him for some months as an Austrian Imperial commissioner to Istanbul. He was recalled later than year to become a diplomat to the Algerian state, which was negotiating treaties with the Austrian and Tuscan authorities. His letters from this time include depiction of these lands, cultures, and government. In one of the missions, he was able to negotiate the freedom of imprisoned Austrian sailors at Algeria. After seven years, he had to leave Algeria, whose relations with the Christin states was worsening. Stendardi was able to extricate a collection of Roman medals and marble inscriptions.

Upon his return, he was named ambassador in Naples to the Kingdom of the Two Sicilies, where he continued his observation and collection of antiques. Returning to Florence after 5 years, he was a member of the Accademia Colombaria, the Accademia fiorentina, and the Accademia degli Apatisti. In Florence, he died of a stroke.

Among his works are the following treatises and essays:
Governo d’Algieri
Commercio di Algieri
Relazione della peste d’Algieri negli anni di Cristo 1752-1753
Meteore ed altri fenomeni osservati in Algieri nell’anno 1753 incominciando dall’equinozio autunnale del 1752
Relazione della tragica morte di Mehemet Pascià bey d’Algieri (murder of Ahmed Bey el Kolli) succeduta nel dì 11 di dicembre dell’anno 1754 
Saggio astronomico, Descrizione dei suoi viaggi al Vesuvio, Divinizzazione sopra la luce in Napoli nel 1756.

References
Obituary in Il Correir Letterario, Florence (1766) pages 594–596.

1721 births
1764 deaths
18th-century Italian writers
18th-century Italian male writers
18th-century travel writers
Italian travel writers
People from Tuscany